The following is a list of notable soft rock bands and artists and their most notable soft rock songs. This list should not include artists whose main style of music is anything other than soft rock, even if they have released one or more songs that fall under the "soft rock" genre. (Such songs can be added under :Category:Soft rock songs.)

Artists which have released music of various different genres throughout their career including soft rock as one of their main styles, may be included together with their notable soft rock songs.

0–9

A

B

C

D

E

F

G

H

I

J

K

L

M

N

O

P

R

S

T

V

W

Y

See also
:Category:Soft rock songs
Yacht rock

References

Bibliography

Soft rock
Soft rock
Soft rock